Käo is a village in Elva Parish, Tartu County in southern Estonia. It has a population of 52 (as of 1 January 2005).

Käo is the birthplace of Estonian poet and writer Jaan Kärner (1891-1958).

References

 

Villages in Tartu County